Zhang Yuan is the name of:

 Zhang Daqian (1899–1983), Chinese painter who used the name Zhang Yuan
 Zhang Hai Yuan (born 1977), a Chinese track and field athlete
 Zhang Yu'an (born 1984), Chinese television personality and radio host in South Korea
 Zhang Yuan (director) (born 1963), Chinese filmmaker
 Zhang Yuan (footballer, born 1989), Chinese association footballer
 Zhang Yuan (footballer, born 1997), Chinese association footballer
 Zhang Yuan (born 1985), Chinese singer with Top Combine
 Yuan Chang (born 1959), Taiwanese-born American medical researcher
 Belinda Chang or Zhang Yuan (born 1963), Taiwanese writer